The 2018 Portland State Vikings football team represented Portland State University during the 2018 NCAA Division I FCS football season. They were led by fourth-year head coach Bruce Barnum and played their home games at Hillsboro Stadium and Providence Park. They were a member of the Big Sky Conference. They finished the season 4–7, 3–5 in Big Sky play to finish in a tie for ninth place.

Previous season
The Vikings finished the 2017 season 0–11, 0–8 in Big Sky play to finish in last place.

Preseason

Polls
On July 16, 2018, during the Big Sky Kickoff in Spokane, Washington, the Vikings were predicted to finish in last place in both the coaches and media poll.

Preseason All-Conference Team
The Vikings had one player selected to the Preseason All-Conference Team.

Charlie Taumoepeau – Jr. TE

Schedule

Source:

Game summaries

at Nevada

at Oregon

College of Idaho

Montana State

at Idaho

at Montana

Northern Colorado

at Sacramento State

Idaho State

at North Dakota

Eastern Washington–The Dam Cup

References

Portland State
Portland State Vikings football seasons
Portland State Vikings football
Portland State Vikings football